The Tenth Council of Ministers of Bosnia and Herzegovina (Bosnian and Croatian: Deseti saziv Vijeća ministara Bosne i Hercegovine) was the Council of Ministers of Bosnia and Herzegovina cabinet formed on 20 February 2008, following the resignation and later reappointment of Nikola Špirić. It was led by Chairman of the Council of Ministers Nikola Špirić. The cabinet was dissolved on 	12 January 2012 and was succeeded by a new Council of Ministers presided over by Vjekoslav Bevanda.

Investiture

History
The Second Špirić cabinet was formed on 20 February 2008, following the resignation and later reappointment of Nikola Špirić. On 1 November 2007, Špirić tendered his resignation in protest of parliamentary reforms imposed by High Representative Miroslav Lajčák. Špirić felt that the reforms would reduce the influence of Bosnia's Serb population. The resignation was deemed by some to be the country's most serious crisis since the end of the Bosnian War.

After the crisis was resolved, he was renominated for the chairman's post on 10 December 2007, confirmed by the Presidency on 27 December 2007 and by Parliament a day later, on 28 December. With Špirić's reappointment, a new cabinet presided by Špirić was officially formed in February 2008, but with little change.

Party breakdown
Party breakdown of cabinet ministers:

Cabinet members
The Cabinet was structured into the offices for the chairman of the Council of Ministers, the two vice chairs and 9 ministries.

References

External links
Website of the Council of Ministers

2008 establishments in Bosnia and Herzegovina
Cabinets established in 2008
2012 disestablishments in Bosnia and Herzegovina
Cabinets disestablished in 2012